George William Youngson (12 December 1919 – 8 December 1982) was a Scottish first-class cricketer. A right arm paceman from Aberdeen, only Douglas Barr and Jimmy Allan have taken more wickets for Scotland.

References

External links
Cricket Europe

1919 births
1982 deaths
Cricketers from Aberdeen
Scottish cricketers